The Jeunesse Sportive du Mont Dore is a handball club in New Caledonia.

Records

Men
 Oceania Handball Champions Cup - 2 titles
Winners - 2006, 2007
Runners-up - 2008

Women
 Oceania Women's Handball Champions Cup
Best Finish - 5th 2007

See also
 Oceania Handball Champions Cup
 Oceania Women's Handball Champions Cup

References

 Team picture away colors
 Team picture home colors
 Sydney Uni win Oceania championships, off to the World Cup and a Europe Tour

External links
 JSMD official webpage (french)
 Profile on New Caledonia Federation official webpage (French)
 FFHB Ligue De Handball Nouvelle Caledonie (French)
 Oceania Continent Handball Federation

Handball clubs
Oceania Handball Clubs
Sport in New Caledonia